Shelly Fairchild (born August 23, 1977) is an American music recording artist. Signed to Columbia Records in 2004, she released her debut album Ride in early 2005. It produced the single "You Don't Lie Here Anymore", a No. 35 on the Billboard Hot Country Singles & Tracks (now Hot Country Songs) charts.

Biography
Fairchild was born in Clinton, Mississippi to a musical family. She began performing at an early age in church and later in her high school's show choir. Fairchild studied communications, theater and music at Mississippi College and subsequently starred in local stage shows including Grease and Always Patsy Cline. She also traveled with the national touring company for Beehive: The 60's Musical.

Personal life

On July 29, 2017, Shelly Fairchild married music executive Deborah DeLoach in Vail, Colorado. Their elopement was covered in Brides which included Venue & Catering by Collective Vail – Shelly's Dress: Free People – Deborah's Dress: Thread & Needle, from BHLDN – Officiant: Susie Kincade and Photography by Mackenzie Neville. Their wedding was voted by Brides as the Top 50 Favorite Real Wedding Photos of 2017. The couple resides in Nashville, TN.

Career
In 2004, Fairchild signed to Columbia Records. Her debut album, Ride, was issued in early 2005. Its lead-off single, "You Don't Lie Here Anymore", co-written with Clay Mills, peaked at No. 35 on the U.S. Billboard Hot Country Songs charts, although subsequent singles failed to chart. She toured in support of the album including an opening spot on Rascal Flatts' sold-out Here's to You tour which also featured Blake Shelton, but was dropped from Columbia by the end of the year.

In 2008, Fairchild signed a record deal with Stroudavarious Records which was founded by producer James Stroud. Her first release was the song "It's All Gonna Work Out", which she released for a charity album called We Are Enterprise.

On April 11, 2011, Fairchild's second album "Ruby's Money" was released. Free from the confines of a major label, Shelly set out to take control of her music and released "Ruby’s Money" on her own label, Revelation Nation Records. She took her unstoppable voice to another level, creating an album that reflected a "Memphis kind of feel" with horns. She co-wrote a song called "Love Everybody," which served as an anchor for this record.

In 2014, Fairchild was one of three background singers for Martina McBride's "Everlasting Tour". Touring with McBride, Fairchild explained, was a huge highlight of her career. "If someone thinks I’m good enough to come and sing backgrounds for them, I’m like, ‘Yeah’ — especially if it's music I love. Martina is somebody I’ve looked up to as a singer my whole life."

In 2016, Fairchild did a PledgeMusic campaign and surpassed her goal by 41% in just two days to record her latest album Buffalo. 
Shelly's third studio album "Buffalo" was released December 2016. This record broke through the Top 100 Country albums on iTunes in the first week. Fairchild went on to release her first single, "Mississippi Turnpike" which she debuted her first music video in 10 years. It premiered exclusively on Taste Of Country and went on to play repeatedly on CMT (U.S. TV channel) making this her first independent play on the major network since her debut album Ride.

In July 2017, Rolling Stone magazine listed Shelly has the Top 10 New Country Artists You Need To Know. Shelly is asked to sing regularly on the Grand Ole Opry and has her own designated artist page on the Opry's website.

Shelly is also an active writer and artist for TV and Film. In January 2017 Shelly signed with Nashville-based Licensing Firm Resin8. Working with various songwriters and producers – Shelly is consistently writing and recording for new film and TV opportunities.

In July 2020, Fairchild was awarded the LGBTQ Rising Star Award at Ty Herndon "Love and Acceptance" show streamed on CMT.

In August 2020, Fairchild was featured in Brandon Stansell's documentary Three Chords and A Lie which doesn't sugarcoat the truth about coming out in many parts of America ─ depicting some truly heart-wrenching moments in his story. It streams on OutTV (Canadian TV channel).

In June 2021, Fairchild sang at the Ryman Auditorium participating as a featured artist in the Nashville and Austin LGBT Chamber of Commerce Pride Event. Streaming on all of their social channels, Tina Cannon, executive director of Austin LGBT Chamber of Commerce, said in a statement: "Working together with Nashville, we are combining the talent of two of the greatest musical communities in the world to produce an amazing live show that directly supports LGBTQ+ artists."

In July 2021, Fairchild began touring with Lennon Stella as one of her background singers for her festival dates including Wonderstruck, Bonnaroo, Roots N Blues and Moon Crush.

Film and Television Placements

Songwriting credits
Little Big Town – "Looking for a Reason"
Maggie Rose – "Put Yourself in My Blues"
Lee DeWyze – "Stay Away"
Mindy McCready – "I Want to Love You"
Kassie DePaiva – "I Want to Love You"
Shelly Fairchild – "You Don't Lie Here Anymore"
Shelly Fairchild – "Tiny Town"

Background vocals

Eric Church – Creepin'
Jason Aldean – Burnin' It Down
Randy Rogers Band – "Kiss Me in the Dark", "Just a Matter of Time", "You Could Change My Mind", "Just Don't Tell Me the Truth"
Ty Herndon – "World I'm Living In"
Trace Adkins – "Jesus and Jones", "Cowboy's Back in Town"
Terri Clark – "Longer"
Ray Scott – "Train Wreck", "Doing Me Wrong" 
Chicago (band) – "Why Can't We" (lead and background)

Discography

Studio albums

Singles

Music videos

References

External links
https://shellyfairchild.com

1977 births
American country singer-songwriters
American women country singers
Living people
Singer-songwriters from Mississippi
People from Clinton, Mississippi
Columbia Records artists
21st-century American singers
21st-century American women singers
Country musicians from Mississippi
Lesbian musicians
American LGBT musicians